Marcel Henrique Garcia Alves Pereira (born 16 October 1992), known as Marcel, is a Brazilian football player who plays for Londrina, on loan from Portimonense.

Club career
He made his professional debut in the Campeonato Brasileiro Série B for Boa Esporte on 19 April 2014 in a game against Atlético Goianiense.

References

External links 
 
 

1992 births
People from São José do Rio Preto
Living people
Brazilian footballers
Primeira Liga players
Liga Portugal 2 players
Mirassol Futebol Clube players
Boa Esporte Clube players
Portimonense S.C. players
F.C. Penafiel players
Brazilian expatriate footballers
Expatriate footballers in Portugal
Association football midfielders
Footballers from São Paulo (state)